The Offaly Intermediate Hurling Championship is an annual hurling competition contested by mid-tier Offaly GAA clubs. The Offaly County Board of the Gaelic Athletic Association has organised it since 1929. The national media covers the competition.

Shamrocks are the title holders (2022) defeating Seir Kieran in the Final, after a replay.

History
The intermediate championship dates back to 1929. It was the third hurling championship to be established in Ofaly, and was seen as a stepping stone between the senior and junior hurling championships.

Over the years the championship proved difficult to sustain. There were no finals in 1940 and 1941, while the 1949 decider was declared void. In 1959 the championship was suspended, however, it was revived in 1963, only to be suspended again until 1978. It has remained a staple of the hurling calendar since then, however, it has undergone some major changes. Originally played as a straight knock-out championship, the competition was eventually expanded to feature a group stage which provided more games.

Shamrocks defeated St Rynagh's in the 2014 championship decider.

The replay of the 2022 final was held in Birr.

Format
The series of games are played during the summer and autumn months with the county final currently being played at O'Connor Park in late autumn. The championship includes a group stage which is followed by a knock-out phase for the top teams.

Twelve clubs currently participate in the Intermediate Championship.

Honours
The trophy presented to the winners is the Fr Carey Cup.

There is promotion and relegation involving the Offaly Senior Hurling Championship and the Offaly Junior A Hurling Championship.

The Offaly Intermediate Hurling Championship is an integral part of the wider Leinster Junior Club Hurling Championship. The winners of the Offaly county final join the champions of the other hurling counties to contest the provincial championship. They often do well there, mar shampla, Ballinamere won the 2013 Leinster title after winning the Offaly Intermediate Hurling Championship. While Shamrocks and Lusmagh were in Leinster finals in 2014 and 2016 respectively, after winning the 2014 and 2015 Offaly Intermediate Hurling Championships.

List of finals

Wins listed by club

References

External links
 Offaly Intermediate Hurling Championship roll of honour

Hurling competitions in County Offaly
Intermediate hurling county championships
Offaly GAA club championships